Major-General Sir Digby Inglis Shuttleworth KCIE CB CBE DSO (23 August 1876 – 15 May 1948) was a senior British Indian Army officer.

Biography

Born on 23 August 1876, Digby Shuttleworth was educated at Bedford School, and joined the 3rd Gurkha Rifles in 1898. He served in India between 1912 and 1916, in Mesopotamia and Iran, and commanded the 39th Infantry Brigade in the Caucasus, as well as the 83rd Infantry Brigade, Army of the Black Sea, between 1917 and 1919. He was President of the Allied Commission of Control, Ottoman War Office, in 1920, and Commander of the 83rd Infantry Brigade during the Chanak Crisis, between 1920 and 1923. He was promoted to the rank of major general in 1929, was Deputy Adjutant and Quartermaster General, Northern Command, India, between 1930 and 1932, and Commander, Kohat District, between 1932 and 1936.

Major General Sir Digby Shutleworth became a Commander of the Order of the British Empire in 1919, a Companion of the Order of the Bath in 1925, and a Knight Commander of the Order of the Indian Empire in 1937. He retired from the British Indian Army in 1936 and died on 15 May 1948.

His older brother was A. R. B. Shuttleworth.

References

1876 births
1948 deaths
People educated at Bedford School
Indian Army generals of World War I
Companions of the Order of the Bath
Commanders of the Order of the British Empire
Knights Commander of the Order of the Indian Empire
Companions of the Distinguished Service Order
British people in colonial India